Memphis Under World compiles previously released and rare tracks from Eightball & MJG's earlier days, as well as appearances on other artists' projects. It was released in 2000.

Track listing 
 Armed Robbery (MJG solo)
 Kick Dat Shit
 Lock'em N Da Trunk (featuring DJ Zirk, 2 Thick)
 Break Da Law (featuring Three 6 Mafia, Project Pat)
 Playas Dream (Eightball solo)
 Who Got Dem 9's (featuring Juicy J, Project Pat)
 Got's To Be Real (Eightball solo)
 Pimp N My Own Rhymes (MJG solo)
 Listen To Da Lyrics
 Wild Boy
 Whatcha Doing

References 

8Ball & MJG albums
2000 compilation albums
Gangsta rap compilation albums